Trine Qvist (born 8 June 1966) is a Danish curler and Olympic medalist. She received a silver medal at the 1998 Winter Olympics in Nagano.

References

External links

1966 births
Living people
Danish female curlers
Curlers at the 1998 Winter Olympics
Olympic silver medalists for Denmark
Olympic curlers of Denmark
Olympic medalists in curling
Medalists at the 1998 Winter Olympics
20th-century Danish women